The Battle of Valle Giulia (battaglia di Valle Giulia) is the conventional name for a clash between Italian militants (left-wing as well as right-wing) and the Italian police in Valle Giulia, Rome, on 1 March 1968. It is still frequently remembered as one of the first violent clashes in Italy's student unrest during the protests of 1968 or "Sessantotto".

Overview
On Friday 1 March, about 4,000 people gathered in the Piazza di Spagna, who began marching through the Sapienza University of Rome campus; some had the intention of occupying the school. When they arrived, the students found themselves in front of an imposing cordon of police, and during the coping that followed, a small group of policemen broke away to deal with violence of an isolated student; the protesters responded with throwing stones and sharp objects. The leaders of the attacks against police were neo-fascist members of the National Vanguard Youth. Left-wing and right-wing students occupied different buildings. In the brawl, 148 injuries were recorded to police, 478 injuries to students, 4 were detained, and 228 were arrested. Eight police cars were destroyed, and five guns were stolen from officers.

See also
Autonomism
Hot Autumn

References

1968 protests
1968 riots
1968 in Italy
Political history of Italy
Riots and civil disorder in Italy
Years of Lead (Italy)
1960s in Rome
Protests in Italy
March 1968 events in Europe
Italian neo-fascism